Silu Wang is a Chinese concert pianist who has performed in Europe and China. She is a Young Steinway Artist.

Biography 

She was born in China and studied piano under Weiling Chen (Shanghai Conservatory of Music) and Jianzhong Wang (Shanghai Conservatory of Music). She then moved to the UK, studied at the Royal Academy of Music with Ian Fountain then the Guildhall School of Music & Drama with Philip Jenkins, and the Royal College of Music with Edna Stern.

She was awarded in numerous competitions, including the Steinway & Sons National Youth Piano Competition, Springboard International Concerto Competition, “ISCHIA”  International Piano Competition, and International Music Competition “Rome” Grand Prize Virtuoso.

In 2017, she was invited by composer Ben Burrows to help with the production and recording of the soundtrack as the only pianist for the first film made of the Warhorse story, 'A Couple of Downs and Outs' in Abbey Road Studio- a project sponsored by British Film Institute run in partnership with York St. John University.

She has released the following albums available on major music platforms including Spotify, Apple Music, Amazon Prime, Google Play Music, Tencent Music, NetEase Music.

Discography (Albums, Singles and EPs) 

Bach: Partita No. 1 (2020)

Rendezvous Vol. 5 (2019)

Rendezvous Vol. 4 (2019)

Rendezvous, Vol. 3: Summer (2019)

Rendezvous Vol. 2: Always With Me (2019)

Fantasy Waltzes Live Concert (2018)

Rendezvous Vol. 1: The Path of Wind (2018)

Contemporary Classical Piano Solo (2017)

Suite, Op. 14, Sz. 62, BB 70 (2016)

References

External links
 

1995 births
Living people
Alumni of the Royal Academy of Music
Chinese women pianists
21st-century pianists
21st-century women pianists